The Braska House is a historic building located in Marion, Iowa, United States.  This is a vernacular house form that utilizes elements from the Greek Revival and Italianate styles.  Similar houses from the same period are found in Muscatine, Iowa, and the Joseph Smith Mansion House in Nauvoo, Illinois is a more elaborate example.  The Greek Revival elements are found in the symmetrical main facade, the straight forward lines, and the lack of embellishments.  The Italianate is found in the low-pitched hipped roof and the wide eaves.  The house was listed on the National Register of Historic Places in 1979.

References

Houses completed in 1855
Vernacular architecture in Iowa
Houses in Marion, Iowa
National Register of Historic Places in Linn County, Iowa
Houses on the National Register of Historic Places in Iowa
1855 establishments in Iowa